Flor de Fango is an outdoor 1908 sculpture by Enrique Guerra, installed in Mexico City, Mexico.

See also
 1908 in art

References

External links

 

1908 sculptures
Outdoor sculptures in Mexico City
Statues in Mexico City
Works by Mexican people